Group D of EuroBasket 2022 consisted of Czech Republic, Finland, Israel, Netherlands, Poland, and Serbia. The games were played from 2 to 8 September 2022 at the O2 Arena in Prague, Czech Republic. The top four teams advanced to the knockout stage.

Teams

Notes

Standings

Matches
All times are local (UTC+2).

Israel vs Finland

Poland vs Czech Republic

Serbia vs Netherlands

Finland vs Poland

Czech Republic vs Serbia

Netherlands vs Israel

Poland vs Israel

Czech Republic vs Netherlands

Serbia vs Finland

Netherlands vs Poland

Finland vs Czech Republic

Israel vs Serbia

Finland vs Netherlands

Czech Republic vs Israel

Serbia vs Poland

See also 
 2022 Serbia EuroBasket team

References

External links
Official website

Group D